The Tractatus pacis toti Christianitati fiendae, or Treaty on the Establishment of Peace throughout Christendom, was the unsuccessful project of universal peace initiated by King George of Bohemia in the 15th century.  For its realization, serious diplomatic negotiations took place among European states in the years 1462-1464.  The project abandoned the mediaeval idea of a universal empire headed by the Emperor Frederick III and the Pope for the concept, up to that time unknown, of a permanent union of independent and equal European states.

The plan of King George of Poděbrady was proposed in the form of a multilateral agreement; this differed from conventional international instruments of the Middle Ages, which in general remained bilateral.  The Project in determining the contractual terms of this agreement would have bound together the parties at issue with similar rights and responsibilities for the achieving of common goals.  All this gives reason to assert that the Treaty on the Establishment of Peace throughout Christendom was the first multilateral treaty to have been closest in design to modern ones.

It is seen as one of historical visions of European unity forgoing the European Union, such as by Anthony D. Smith, a prominent scholar of nationalism.

References

Bibliography
 Treaty on the Establishment of Peace throughout Christendom. Edit. Kejř J., Transl. Dvořák I. In VANĚČEK V., The Universal Peace Organization of King George of Bohemia a fifteenth Century Plan for World Peace 1462 / 1464. Prague: Publishing House of the Czechoslovak Academy of Sciences 1964, p. 81-90.
 Anthony D. Smith. "National Identity and the Idea of European Unity" International Affairs, Vol. 68, No. 1 (Jan., 1992), pp. 55–76

See also
 Westphalian system

Peace treaties
15th century in Bohemia
Treaties of the Holy Roman Empire
1462 in Europe
15th-century Christianity
1460s treaties
Treaties of the Kingdom of Bohemia
1460s in the Holy Roman Empire
Christianity and law in the 15th century
George of Poděbrady